A shark repellent is any method of driving sharks away from an area. Shark repellents are a category of animal repellents. Shark repellent technologies include magnetic shark repellent, electropositive shark repellents, electrical repellents, and semiochemicals. Shark repellents can be used to protect people from sharks by driving the sharks away from areas where they are likely to kill human beings. In other applications, they can be used to keep sharks away from areas they may be a danger to themselves due to human activity. In this case, the shark repellent serves as a shark conservation method. There are some naturally occurring shark repellents; modern artificial shark repellents date to at least the 1940s, with the United States Navy using them in the Pacific Ocean theater of World War II.

Natural repellents
It has traditionally been believed that sharks are repelled by the smell of a dead shark; however, modern research has had mixed results.

The Pardachirus marmoratus fish (finless sole, Red Sea Moses sole) repels sharks through its secretions. The best-understood factor is pardaxin, acting as an irritant to the sharks' gills, but other chemicals have been identified as contributing to the repellent effect.

In 2017, the US Navy announced that it was developing a synthetic analog of hagfish slime with potential application as a shark repellent.

History
Some of the earliest research on shark repellents took place during the Second World War when military services sought to minimize the risk to stranded aviators and sailors in the water. Research has continued to the present, with notable researchers including Americans Eugenie Clark, and later Samuel H. Gruber, who has conducted tests at the Bimini Sharklab in Bimini, and the Japanese scientist Kazuo Tachibana.  Future celebrity chef Julia Child developed shark repellent while working for the Office of Strategic Services

Initial work, which was based on historical research and studies at the time, focused on using the odor of another dead shark. Efforts were made to isolate the active components in dead shark bodies that repelled other sharks. Eventually, it was determined that certain copper compounds like copper acetate, in combination with other ingredients, could mimic a dead shark and drive live sharks away from human beings in the water. Building on this work, Stewart Springer and others patented a "shark repellent" consisting of a combination of copper acetate and a dark-colored dye to obscure the user.
This shark repellent, known as "Shark Chaser", was long supplied to sailors and aviators of the United States Navy, initially packaged in cake form using a water-soluble wax binder and rigged to life vests. The Navy employed Shark Chaser extensively between 1943 and 1973. It is believed that the composition does repel sharks in some situations, but not in all, with about a 70% effectiveness rating.

On the other hand, Albert Tester questioned the idea that dead shark bodies or chemicals based on them could work as shark repellent. In 1959, he prepared and tested extracts of decaying shark flesh on tiger sharks in Hawaii and blacktip sharks at Enewetak Atoll. Tester found that not only did the dead shark extracts fail to repel any sharks, but several sharks had a "weak or strong attraction" to them. Tester reported a similar failure to repel sharks by a 1959 test at Enewetak of "an alleged shark repellent, supplied by a fisherman, which contained extract of decayed shark flesh as the principal component." Research has continued into the 2000s on using extracts from dead sharks or synthesizing such chemicals.

Research
Since the 1970s, there have been studies of how the Moses sole repels sharks, with Clark and Gruber both studying it.  it has not found practical use, however, as the chemicals are perishable, and the repellent had to be injected into the shark's mouth to be effective; in nature the substance is secreted on the skin and is thus ingested by sharks when they bite the sole.

Since the 1980s, there is evidence that surfactants such as sodium lauryl sulfate can act as a shark repellent at concentrations of the order of 100 parts per million. However, this does not meet the desired "cloud" deterrence level of 0.1 parts per million.

There have been validated field tests and studies to confirm the effectiveness of semiochemicals as a shark repellent. From 2005-2010, an extensive study on the effectiveness of semiochemicals as a shark repellent was conducted by scientists from SharkDefense Technologies and Seton Hall University. The study's results were published in the scientific journal Ocean & Coastal Management in 2013. The study concluded that the existence of a putative chemical shark repellent has been confirmed.

As of 2014, SharkDefense partnered with SharkTec LLC to manufacture the semiochemical in a canister as a shark repellent for consumers called Anti-Shark 100.

Recently, SharkDefense used the same semiochemicals found in SharkTec's product to reduce shark by-catch by 71% in a government grant initiative. The government agency NOAA released these findings in a report to Congress.

In 2018 independent tests were carried out on five Shark Repellent technologies using Great white sharks. Only Shark Shield’s Ocean Guardian Freedom+ Surf showed measurable results, with encounters reduced from 96% to 40%. Rpela (electrical repellent technology), SharkBanz bracelet & SharkBanz surf leash (magnetic shark repellent technology) and Chillax Wax (essential oils) showed no measurable effect on reducing shark attacks.

In popular culture
The 1947 Robb White book Secret Sea mentions a copper acetate shark repellent developed by the U.S. Navy.

In a 2015 a MythBusters episode, the hosts Adam Savage and Jamie Hyneman used an extract of dead sharks, and were able to drive away 10-20 Caribbean reef sharks and nurse sharks in only a few seconds on two occasions. The repellent used consisted of extracts from other species of shark bodies, and sharks did not return for over 5 minutes on both occasions.

See also
Chain mail
Bear spray

References

Pesticides
Shark attack prevention